Piola is a station of the Milan Metro, on line M2. The station grants direct access to the Politecnico di Milano (POLIMI).

History 
Piola station was activated on September 27, 1969, as part of the first section of line 2, between Cascina Gobba and Caiazzo.

Structures and facilities 
The underground station is named after the nearby Piazzale Gabrio Piola, though it does not have a direct access to the square. There are three entrances to the station: Via Pacini, Via Bazzini, and Via d'Ovidio near Politecnico di Milano Architecture Building.

Piola station primarily serves the Politecnico di Milano, Città Studi area near the University of Milan and the Istituto dei Tumori.

Interchanges 
Several urban bus lines stop near the station:
  Trolley stop (V.le Gran Sasso P.le Piola M2, lines 90 e 91]])
  Trolley stop (V.le Romagna P.le Piola M2, lines 90 e 91]])
  Bus stop

Services
The station has:
 Accessibility for Disability
 Escalators
 Ticket machine
 Stazione video surveillance

Bibliography 
 Giorgio Meregalli, Gli impianti ferroviari della linea 2 della Metropolitana di Milano, in "Ingegneria Ferroviaria", May 1971, pp. 469–492.

References

External links

Line 2 (Milan Metro) stations
Railway stations opened in 1969
1969 establishments in Italy
Railway stations in Italy opened in the 20th century